Blues March: Portrait of Art Blakey is an album by the New York Rhythm Machine, led by pianist John Hicks.

Background
Pianist John Hicks was part of Art Blakey's band for two years from 1964. Blakey died in 1990.

Recording and music
The album was recorded at Sear Sound, New York City, on October 19, 1992. The musicians were Hicks, bassist Marcus McLaurine, and drummer Victor Lewis.

Releases
Blues March: Portrait of Art Blakey was released by Venus Records. Venus later issued a CD, entitled Moanin': Portrait of Art Blakey, credited to Hicks as leader, that used some of the tracks from the Blues March album and some from an earlier release with the title Moanin': Portrait of Art Blakey.

Track listing
"No Problem – 1"
"Whisper Not"
"Like Someone in Love"
"Blues March"
"Some Other Spring"
"A Night in Tunisia"

Personnel
John Hicks – piano
Marcus McLaurine – bass
Victor Lewis – drums

References

John Hicks (jazz pianist) albums
1992 albums